Auster AOP may refer to:

 Taylorcraft Auster - Taylorcraft Auster I, II, III, IV and V
 Auster AOP.6
 Auster AOP.9